Abby Jimenez was an advertising executive in the Philippines.

She was a chairman of Publicis JimenezBasic (sometimes Jimenez Basic), an advertising agency in the Philippines. She and her husband Mon Jimenez were featured on the cover of Adobo Magazine in February 2009. Her firm Publicis JimenezBasic with 120 employees managed advertising accounts for Philippine brands such as Decolgen, Jollibee, Skyflakes, and Lucky Me, and for clients such as Unilab, Greenwich Pizza, and Manila Bulletin. In 2011 her husband Ramon Jimenez, Jr. was chosen to be the tourism secretary for the Philippines.

Her firm handled public advocacy campaigns including one to encourage Philippine families to eat meals together. Jimenez and her husband began a firm helping clients with media and marketing issues entitled Woo Consultants. She was a judge for advertising awards including the Tambuli Awards sponsored by the University of Asia and the Pacific. She spoke at industry conferences. In 2007, her agency was named Agency of the Year.

She was the mother of Philippine fashion designer Sassa Jimenez. She died in 2016 of lower motor neuron disease.

References

20th-century Filipino businesspeople
Advertising directors
Filipino chairpersons of corporations
Filipino women in business
21st-century Filipino businesspeople
1958 births
2016 deaths